Lawrence Henry Woolner (12 April 1912 – 21 July 1985) was an American film producer, distributor, exhibitor and executive. He worked with Roger Corman on a number of films, helping him found New World Pictures. However he clashed with Corman and soon joined Warner Communications to set up his own company, Dimension Pictures, which ran for ten years. He was the brother of producer Bernard Woolner.

Select filmography
The Young, the Evil and the Savage (1968) - producer
Teenage Doll (1957) - associate producer
Terminal Island (1973) - executive producer
The Working Girls (1974) - executive producer
Raw Force (1982) - producer

References

External links

1912 births
1985 deaths
American film producers
20th-century American businesspeople